The Queen Louise Bridge is a bridge over the Neman River in Lithuania–Russia border, that connects the Lithuanian town Panemunė and Russian city Sovetsk (historically: Tilsit). It is named after Queen Louise of Mecklenburg-Strelitz.

Gallery

References

Road bridges in Russia
Road bridges in Lithuania
Bridges completed in 1907
Cultural heritage monuments of regional significance in Kaliningrad Oblast
Transport in Kaliningrad Oblast